Callidrepana gemina is a moth in the family Drepanidae. It is found in north-eastern India and the Chinese provinces of Guangdong, Fujian and Zhejiang.

The length of the forewings is 15–17 mm for males and 17.5–20 mm for females. The ground colour is yellowish white, the apical markings, cell-spot and subterminal spots dark reddish brown, while the other markings are yellowish brown. The costa is dull yellowish orange at the base and both wings have bands of brilliant lustrous scales along the veins proximal to the postmedial fascia, along the distal edge of the postmedial fascia and along the basal half of the costa.

Subspecies
Callidrepana gemina gemina (north-eastern India)
Callidrepana gemina curta Watson, 1968 (China: Guangdong, Fujian, Zhejiang)

References

Moths described in 1968
Drepaninae